Emma Cate Fuhrmann (born September 15, 2001) is an American actress known for her work as Finnegan O'Neil in The Magic of Belle Isle (2012), Espn Friedman in Blended (2014), and Cassie Lang in Avengers: Endgame (2019).

Personal life
Born in Dallas, Texas, Fuhrmann is an avid supporter of the Alzheimer's Association and has been one of their Celebrity Champions since 2011. She also supports U.S. Military families through The Boot Campaign. She makes it her goal to always give back to the community in which she is shooting her films, whether it be the Food Pantry in Greenwood Lake, NY where she shot The Magic of Belle Isle , or the orphanage, Grace Help Centre, in Rustenburg, South Africa near where she shot Blended. Emma also works with cancer patients at Cook Children's Hospital in Fort Worth, Texas , and is a strong supporter of The Gentle Barn, a California-based sanctuary for abused animals, as well as The Humane Society of the United States.

During various interviews in 2013, then 11-year-old Fuhrmann talked about being very athletic, swimming on a swim team in the summer, and skiing on the slopes in the winter. At that time she also said that she liked fashion and designing her own clothes, and hoped to have her own label when she grew up. She teamed up with Drew Barrymore's Flower Beauty in July 2013 to promote her own makeup line for the teen demographic.

Career
Her film credits include playing the lead role as Finnegan O'Neil opposite Morgan Freeman in the Rob Reiner-directed movie, The Magic of Belle Isle, and her co-starring role as Adam Sandler's character's daughter, Espn, in Blended, along with Sandler and Drew Barrymore. Fuhrmann was also featured in the 2015 film, Lost in the Sun, with Josh Duhamel and Lynn Collins. Furthermore, she played an older Cassie Lang in Avengers: Endgame. However, it was announced in 2020 that she would be replaced in the MCU franchise as Cassie Lang by Kathryn Newton. Fuhrmann later posted to her Twitter that she only found out that she'd be replaced when the news was made public.

She was named one of the 11 Summer Box Office Newbies you need to know about by Teen.com in 2014.

Filmography

Film

Television

Music Video

Awards and nominations

References

External links

 

2001 births
21st-century American actresses
Actresses from Dallas
American child actresses
American film actresses
American television actresses
Film child actresses
Television child actresses
Living people